Jenny Owen Youngs (born November 22, 1981) is an American singer-songwriter. She has released three albums and a handful of EPs both independently and via Nettwerk Records, and has toured worldwide. Youngs is also a songwriting collaborator whose cuts include the 2018 Panic! at the Disco single "High Hopes," as well as songs with Brett Dennen, Ingrid Michaelson, Shungudzo, Pitbull, and others.

Youngs' songs have been used in TV shows such as Weeds, Grey's Anatomy, Nurse Jackie, Suburgatory, and Switched at Birth. In 2017, her 2012 song "Wake Up" was featured over the end credits of BoJack Horseman'''s season 4 finale. On March 28, 2018, it was announced that Youngs would work as the composer for Muscle Memory, a short film directed by Carly Usdin being made as a part of the American Film Institute's Directing Workshop for Women.

Early life and education
Youngs was born in a hospital elevator. Raised in Newton, New Jersey, Youngs grew up playing the flute, the french horn and the sousaphone in elementary school and the tuba in junior high school. At age 14, her older step-brother told her that if she wanted to be in a band she needed to learn how to play the guitar. She attended Kittatinny Regional High School and graduated from State University of New York at Purchase with a degree in studio composition."The Sound of Youngs' America: One singer-songwriter you have to hear". Fairfield County Weekly (Bridgeport, Connecticut). November 10, 2005.

Music career

 As a solo artist 

Batten the Hatches
Youngs' first album Batten the Hatches was recorded with borrowed equipment at SUNY-Purchase and self-released in 2005. While at Austin's South by Southwest, Youngs met Gary Calamar, the music supervisor of Showtime's Weeds, which led to her song "Fuck Was I" appearing in Weeds second-season premiere. The notoriety resulted in a contract with Canadian indie label Nettwerk Records. Nettwerk Records re-released her album Batten the Hatches on April 10, 2007, with new artwork and an additional song ("Drinking Song").Shuster, Fred (April 10, 2007). "Hear Today: Stax in Spotlight for 50th Anniversary". Daily News of Los Angeles. p. U5. Newsweek called the album a top pick, complimenting Youngs' "simple, stripped-down guitar" and her "edgy lyrics and sweetly sung melodies".<ref>"The Checklist". Newsweek. April 16, 2007. p. 103.</ref> The Sydney Morning Herald described the album as an "accomplished debut".

"Fuck Was I" was also released on Weeds: Music from the Original Series, Vol. 2.

Transmitter Failure
Youngs released her second album, Transmitter Failure, on May 26, 2009. She supported Regina Spektor in her 2009 tour promoting the album Far.

Youngs collaborated with Xian Hawkins under the moniker Bell Horses, which resulted in the album This Loves Last Time (2009). In the fall of 2009, Youngs performed alongside Chuck Ragan, Jim Ward, Tim Barry, Joey Cape, Dave Hause, Frank Turner, and others as part of the 2009 Revival Tour.

An Unwavering Band of Light
On July 1, 2010, Youngs launched a Kickstarter campaign to fund her third album and reached her goal of $20,000 in 28 hours. Her drummer, Elliot Jacobson, had his chest waxed as an incentive to reach the goal. The campaign ended on August 13, 2010, with a total of $38,543 and 646 backers. On February 7, 2012, the Kickstarter-backed third studio album, titled An Unwavering Band of Light was released. In 2017, a song from that album, "Wake Up", appeared over the end titles of the season Four finale of Netflix's Bojack Horseman.

Side Projects, touring, and other releases
On April 5, 2018, Youngs released the song "Won't Let Go of Me" which was featured in the Grey's Anatomy episode "Hold Back The River" (Season 14, Episode 18). The song was written with Aaron Espe and Kyle Neal. Neal produced the song while Espe was credited as a co-producer.

On March 28, 2018, it was announced that Youngs would work as the composer for Muscle Memory, a short film directed by Carly Usdin being made as a part of the American Film Institute's Directing Workshop for Women.

Youngs has toured worldwide headlining and also supporting artists such as Regina Spektor, Against Me!, Frank Turner, and Streetlight Manifesto.

In January 2013, she was announced to rejoin The Revival Tour, where she performed alongside Chuck Ragan, Rocky Votolato, Dave Hause, Jenny O., and Tim McIlrath of Rise Against.

In December 2012, Youngs began her Exhibit project in which she visited a New York City museum once a week, recording a song inspired by her visit within the same week. The album was released on Bandcamp and consists of 8 tracks.

Youngs covered "Have You Forgotten" by Red House Painters for American Laundromat Records's charity CD "Sing Me To Sleep – Indie Lullabies" released in Spring 2010. In March 2010, Youngs toured with Bess Rogers and A.W. on their 'Spring Break Forever Tour', after which she flew out to the United Kingdom to support Motion City Soundtrack on their London, Manchester, Birmingham and Glasgow tour. She headlined a show at "Monto Water Rats" in London in April 2010.

In addition to her solo career, Youngs was a member of the band The Robot Explosion, a side project with fellow musicians and friends Bess Rogers, Andrew Futral, and Saul Simon-MacWilliams.

Youngs has toured with Vienna Teng, opening for the singer on the Green Caravan Tour, and opened for Aimee Mann at London's indigO2 on July 27, 2007. Youngs toured with Glen Phillips of Toad the Wet Sprocket in August 2007, and with Sean Hayes, with whom she co-headlined. She played in Belgium, Netherlands, Norway, and Sweden in November and December 2007.

Co-writing and recent years
In 2015, Youngs moved to Los Angeles where she is working on her next album and co-writing with and for other artists. Youngs' notable cuts include Panic! at the Disco's 2018 single "High Hopes", the 2018 song from the Fifty Shades Freed soundtrack, "Come On Back", which she co-wrote with Shungudzo and producer Jordan Palmer and appeared in both the film and on the soundtrack, "Miss America", which she co-wrote with Ingrid Michaelson and others for Michaelson's 2016 album It Doesn't Have to Make Sense, and Pitbull's 2016 single "Bad Man", which was debuted at the 58th Annual Grammy Awards. She also worked closely with Brett Dennen and Dan Wilson to write three of the five songs on Dennen's 2018 EP, Let's... including the title track. Youngs often collaborates with her friends Chris Farren and A.W.

Buffering the Vampire Slayer
In September 2016, Youngs launched the podcast Buffering the Vampire Slayer with Kristin Russo. The podcast discusses the popular television series Buffy the Vampire Slayer one episode at a time, and each episode ends with an original recap song about the episode, penned by Youngs and Russo. The podcast is part of the Stitcher Premium network and has been featured in A.V. Club, Entertainment Weekly, Autostraddle, and Buzzfeed.

Veronica Mars Investigations
In August 2019, Youngs launched the podcast Veronica Mars Investigations with Helen Zaltzman. The podcast discusses the popular television series Veronica Mars one episode at a time.

Personal life
On June 12, 2013, Youngs came out, announcing "I am super gay", and that she was engaged to marry her girlfriend Kristin Russo, whom she married on August 25, 2013. On May 25, 2018, the couple announced they are no longer together but remain friends and will keep working in their mutual projects. Both of them said, "We've come to realize that we will be better—both to ourselves and to each other—within the context of a friendship, rather than a marriage."

On May 3, 2020, Youngs announced her engagement to Jess Abbott of Tancred on Twitter.

Discography

Albums

Singles
 "Split" with Dave House (UK vinyl 12" single released April 2007), Gravity DIP Records
 "Fuck Was I" (UK single released May 2007), Nettwerk Music Group
 "Things We Don't Need Anymore" (digital single), Nettwerk Music Group
 "Great Big Plans" (digital single, June 2011)
 "Jenny Owen Youngs and A.W. Sing the Magnetic Fields" (vinyl 7" single, September 2013), Asbestos Records

EPs
 The Take Off All Your Clothes EP March 12, 2007
 Led to the Sea EP April 7, 2009
 Last Person EP March 23, 2010
 Jukebox the Ghost + Jenny Owen Youngs split EP July 30, 2013
 Slack Tide February 17, 2015
 Night Shift November 15, 2019
 Echo Mountain March 10, 2021
 It's Dangerous to Go Alone June 10, 2022

Compilations

Co-writing credits

References

External links

2006 interview with City Belt

1981 births
Living people
State University of New York at Purchase alumni
American women singer-songwriters
Singer-songwriters from New Jersey
American lesbian musicians
Lesbian songwriters
American LGBT singers
American LGBT songwriters
Lesbian singers
LGBT people from New Jersey
People from Montclair, New Jersey
Nettwerk Records artists
Guitarists from New Jersey
21st-century American women singers
21st-century American singers
People from Newton, New Jersey
21st-century American women guitarists
21st-century American guitarists
American lesbian writers